The mayor of Carmel-by-the-Sea is the official head and chief executive officer of Carmel-by-the-Sea, California. The mayor is elected for a two-year term and limited to serving no more than two terms. Under the California Constitution, all judicial, school, county, and city offices, including those of chartered cities, are nonpartisan. 

Dave Potter is the city's current mayor, having assumed office on November 8, 2018. He was reelected on November 3, 2020, again for a 2 year term as mayor, with 73.62% of the vote.

List of mayors

See also
 Carmel City Hall
 Timeline of Carmel-by-the-Sea, California

References

Carmel-by-the-Sea
Mayors